Acacia havilandiorum, also known as Haviland's wattle or needle wattle, is a shrub of the genus Acacia and the subgenus Plurinerves. It is native to areas in South Australia, New South Wales and Victoria.

Description
Like most species of Acacia it has phyllodes rather than true leaves.

Taxonomy
The species was first described by Joseph Maiden in 1920 as Acacia havilandi, despite the specific epithet honouring both Edwin Haviland and his son, who " specialised in the fertilisation of Australian plants and (have) also worked at taxonomy and other branches of botany" The epithet was changed to a genitive plural  (havilandiorum) to accord with ICN Art. 60.8 (Shenzhen Code, 2018).

Distribution
The plant has a scattered and discontinuous distribution from as far west as the Eyre Peninsula in South Australia where it is common, to  further north in the Flinders Range through to Griffith and Cobar but the range extends as far as Gilgandra in the east. It is only known around Horsham in the north west region of Victoria. In New South Wales the plant is mostly found in the Pilliga Scrub between Gilgandra and Milgee as a part of mallee and box woodland communities.

See also
 List of Acacia species

References

havilandiorum
Flora of South Australia
Flora of New South Wales
Flora of Victoria (Australia)
Taxa named by Joseph Maiden
Plants described in 1920